Popping is the first popup album by South Korean–Japanese boy group ONF, released on August 9th, 2021 by WM Entertainment and distributed by Stone Music Entertainment. The album contains five tracks, including the funky disco title track "Popping."

Background and release 
On July 14th, 2021, WM Entertainment announced ONF would be having a comeback in early August. On July 18th, the first official teaser revealed the date of the comeback as August 9th as well as the album and title track as "Popping." "Popping" topped the Bugs music chart upon its release.

Promotion 
ONF held their comeback showcase on August 9th at the YES24 Live Hall and via V Live where the group performed their new songs "Popping," "Dry Ice" and "Summer End." They also performed tracks from their previous albums: "Sukhumvit Swimming" and "On-You - Interlude." The group performed "Popping" on M Countdown for their first day of promotions.

Achievements 
"Popping" ranked #1 on the Bugs music chart upon its release, as well as the iTunes US K-Pop Song Chart and Worldwide iTunes Song Chart for seven days. In addition, the album topped the Worldwide iTunes Album Chart in 15 countries. "Popping" also charted at #2 on the Billboard World Digital Song Sales chart.

Track listing

References 

2021 EPs